Minuscule 753 (in the Gregory-Aland numbering), ε1292 (von Soden), is a Greek minuscule manuscript of the New Testament written on parchment. Palaeographically it has been assigned to the 11th century. The manuscript has no complex contents. Scrivener labelled it as 760e.

Description 

The codex contains the text of the Gospel of Matthew (23:11-21), on 1 parchment leaf (size ).

The text is written in one column per page, 22 lines per page.

The text is divided according to the Ammonian Sections, without references to the Eusebian Canons, it contains lectionary markings, but they were added by a later hand.

Minuscule 2819 

The leaf with text of Matthew 6:6-20 is classified as minuscule 2819 on the list Gregory-Aland. The size of the leaf is ). It is written in 1 column per page, 19 lines per page. It contains lectionary markings.

Text 

Aland the Greek text of the codex did not place it in any Category.

History 

Gregory dated the manuscript 753 to the 11th or 12th century. The manuscript is currently dated by the INTF to the 11th century. The manuscript 2819 Gregory dated to the 12th or 13th century.

It was added to the list of New Testament manuscripts by Scrivener (760) and Gregory (753). Gregory saw the manuscript in 1885.

The manuscript is now housed at the Bibliothèque nationale de France (Suppl. Gr. 1035) in Paris.

See also 

 List of New Testament minuscules
 Biblical manuscript
 Textual criticism
 Minuscule 752

References

Further reading 
 

Greek New Testament minuscules
11th-century biblical manuscripts
Bibliothèque nationale de France collections